Veliki Rzav ("Great Rzav") may refer to:
 Veliki Rzav (Golija), a river in Serbia, tributary of the Rzav
Rzav (Drina),  a river in Serbia and Bosnia and Herzegovina also known as Veliki Rzav